Hindsia is a genus of about 11 species of shrubs in the family Rubiaceae, native to tropical South America, mainly in 
Brazil. The species Hindsia longiflora and H. violacea were used to separate the genus from Rondeletia. The genus was named in honour of Richard Brinsley Hinds.

Species include:
Hindsia arianeae Di Maio
Hindsia cucullata Di Maio
Hindsia glabra K.Schum.
Hindsia ibitipocensis Di Maio
Hindsia irwinii Steyerm.
Hindsia longiflora (Cham.) Benth. ex Lindl.
Hindsia phyllocalyx K.Schum.
Hindsia ramosissima Gardner
Hindsia republicana Di Maio
Hindsia sessilifolia Di Maio
Hindsia violacea Benth. ex Lindl.

References

Rubiaceae genera
Coussareeae